Tri-West Hendricks High School is a public high school located in Lizton, Indiana.

About
Tri-West Hendricks High School was constructed in 1975, with a junior high (Tri-West Middle School) later added in 1983 (a new junior high was completed in 2003, into which the 6-8 graders moved). Tri-West was formed from the consolidation of three high schools: Pittsboro, Lizton, and North Salem. This also caused the formation of the North West Hendricks School Corporation. In Pittsboro, the original gym remains as part of the elementary school. The high school was expanded and renovated between the years of 2008 to 2010. It holds grades 9-12 from the townships of Middle, Union, and Eel River. The school mascot is the Bruin. The school colors are navy blue and vegas gold. The location of the school is rural, surrounded by mainly farmland. It is not an ethnically diverse school, as the students are nearly all (96.5%) caucasian, respectively.

Athletics 
Tri-West offers 18 varsity sports.

Notable alumni
 Jeff Gordon, four-time NASCAR Cup Series champion (1995, 1997, 1998, 2001), three-time Daytona 500 winner (1997, 1999, 2005), 3rd most career wins in the NASCAR Cup Series with 93, considered one of the greatest NASCAR drivers of all time.
 Peyton Hendershot, NFL tight end for the Dallas Cowboys
 Bridget Sloan, gymnast, 2008 Olympic silver medalist, 2009 World All Around Champion

See also
 List of high schools in Indiana

References

External links
 

Public high schools in Indiana
Schools in Hendricks County, Indiana
1975 establishments in Indiana
Educational institutions established in 1975